María Olivia Mönckeberg Pardo (born 29 May 1944) is a Chilean journalist, essayist, and academic. She received the National Prize for Journalism in 2009.

She is a full professor at the University of Chile and has been the director of its  (ICEI) since 2010. Her work has focused on investigative journalism, and she has written several books which caused great impact at the time of their publication.

Professional career
In 1972 María Olivia Mönckeberg qualified as a journalist at the Catholic University of Chile. A year earlier, in 1971, she had begun professional work at her alma mater's magazine, Debate Universitario.

In September 1973, she joined the magazine Ercilla, where she worked until the beginning of 1977. That year she became one of the founders of  magazine, where she remained until 1981 as editor of Economy and Society. She then joined the political magazine , opposed to the military dictatorship, where she was editor-in-chief and deputy director until 1987.

During the 1980s she was the founder of the Women for Life Movement, and in 1984 she received the Louis Lyons Award for Conscience and Integrity in Journalism, granted by the Nieman Foundation of Harvard University.

In 1987 Mönckeberg joined the newspaper , where she worked until March 1990, when she became editor-in-chief of La Nación, a newspaper where she was in charge of Sunday political interviews from 1994 to 1998.

Academic career

Mönckeberg is a professor of the University of Chile, and has been director of its Institute of Communication and Image (ICEI) since 2010. She was re-elected for her second term (2014-2018) in June 2014. She holds the chairs of ethics and journalistic treatments and investigative journalism at the School of Journalism. She also coordinates ICEI's Diploma in Investigative Journalism.

Publications
 Crimen bajo estado de sitio, Editorial Emisión (1986)
 El saqueo de los grupos económicos al Estado de Chile, Ediciones B (2001)
 El imperio del Opus Dei en Chile, Ediciones B (2003). She released an updated version in 2016 under the Debate imprint.
 La privatización de las universidades. Una historia de dinero, poder e influencias, La Copa Rota (2005)
 El negocio de las universidades en Chile, Random House Mondadori (2007)
 Los magnates de la prensa, Random House Mondadori (2009)
 Karadima. El señor de los infiernos, Ramdon House Mondadori (2011)
 Con fines de lucro, Random House Mondadori (2013)
 La máquina para defraudar. Casos Penta y Soquimich, Penguin Random House (2015)
 El poder de la UDI. 50 años del gremialismo en Chile, Debate (2017)

Awards and recognitions
 1984, Louis Lyons Award for Conscience and Integrity in Journalism, granted by the Nieman Foundation
 2006, Finalist for the Altazor Award with La privatización de las universidades
 2009, National Prize for Journalism
 2011, Finalist for the Altazor Award with Karadima. El señor de los infiernos
 2013, N'aitún Award, granted by the Artists Pro Ecology Cultural Corporation
 2016, Santiago Municipal Literature Award for La máquina para defraudar. Casos Penta y Soquimich

References

External links

 María Olivia Mönckeberg at the Institute of Communication and Image

1944 births
20th-century Chilean women writers
21st-century Chilean women writers
Chilean journalists
Chilean people of German descent
Chilean women essayists
Chilean women journalists
Investigative journalists
Living people
Pontifical Catholic University of Chile alumni
Academic staff of the University of Chile
Writers from Santiago